Md. Abdul Halim is a Bangladesh Awami League politician and the former Member of Parliament of Mymensingh-8.

Career
Halim was elected to parliament from Mymensingh-8 as a Bangladesh Awami League candidate in 1973.

References

Living people
Awami League politicians
1st Jatiya Sangsad members
Year of birth missing (living people)